Go to Sleep Jeff is the Wiggles' 16th album, released in 2003 by ABC Music and distributed by Roadshow Entertainment. The album was nominated for the ARIA Award for Best Children's Album but lost to Hi-5's Celebrate.

Track list
 Introduction 
 Lullaby Overture 
 Introduction 
 I Love it When it Rains 
 Introduction 
 Take A Trip Out On The Sea 
 Introduction 
 Aspri Mera Key Ya Mas (instrumental)
 Introduction 
 Maranoa Lullaby (from Central Australia) 
 Introduction 
 Polish Lullaby (Star Lullaby) 
 Introduction 
 October Winds 
 Introduction 
 John of Dreams
 Introduction 
 Go to Sleep Jeff (instrumental) (Brahms' Lullaby) 
 Introduction 
 Georgia's Song 
 Anthony's Message 
 Lullaby Overture (instrumental)
 I Love it When it Rains 
 Take A Trip Out On The Sea 
 Aspri Mera Key Ya Mas (Greek lullaby) 
 Polish Lullaby (Star lullaby) 
 Go to Sleep Jeff (Brahams' lullaby) 
 Georgia's Song

The Wiggles albums
2003 albums